This is the Finnish national men's ice hockey team's roster to the 1995 IIHF Ice Hockey World Championships.

Manager:

Heikki Riihiranta

Coaches:

Curt Lindström
Hannu Aravirta

Other personnel:

Juhani Ikonen (Medical Attendant)
Jari Rautiainen (Physio)
Veli-Matti Pohjonen (Masseur)
Tomi Mäkipää (Equipment Manager)
Aleksander Surenkin (Equipment Maintenance)
Mika Saarinen (Statistics)
Esko Nokelainen (Scouting)

1995 World Championships roster
IIHF World Championship rosters